James Irvin Koehnline is an American collage artist whose work has appeared in many anarchist periodicals and books, as well as music CDs. He has co-edited a number of books and had his work collected in Magpie Reveries. He designs and edits the yearly Autonomedia Calendar of Jubilee Saints which is also the thematic core for the Daily Bleed Calendar. He lives in Seattle, Washington, and worked for some years at Recollection Used Books.

Art career
Koehnline has been creating works of art, in various media all his life, largely influenced by his father's passion for surrealism. He attended the Minneapolis College of Art and Design before moving on to Columbia College in Chicago. Most recently he studied digital media at the Art Institute of Seattle. Meeting at Columbia College, Koehnline gained further direction under the mentoring of collagist, sculptor and host of the weekly radio broadcast "Art and Artists" (WFMT), Harry Bouras. Koehnline has also been involved in a number of grass roots political groups and in 1985, joined several other artists in establishing the collective gallery/studio, Axe Street Arena. Housed in an abandoned Golblatt's department store in Logan Square, Chicago, the stated aim of this project, according to Koehnline, was to "explore the place where art and politics meet". At Axe Street, Koehnline began working with monotype print making (the press being a gift from Bouras) and produced his "Chaos Papers", marbled paper created with vivid printing inks similar to the style of Japanese Suminagashi, in which the volatile inks drift reactively across vats of water, stirred into swirls and patterns by chemical tensions and earthly vibrations and the subway below.

While living and working at Axe Street Arena, Koehnline met Ron Sakolsky, music critic, anarchist and professor at Sangamon University, Illinois, at the Conference of the Alliance for Cultural Democracy. Years later, in Seattle, the pair edited the book, Gone to Croatan: the Origins of North America Drop Out Culture, published by Autonomedia (New York) in 1993, the same year that Koehnline got married, with Sakolsky presiding over the ceremony. Back at Axe Street Arena, Koehnline curated two mail art shows. The first show, "The Haymarket Centennial International Mail Art Exhibition," explored the Haymarket Massacre, labor issues and the history of May Day, with contributions from nearly 50 countries. The result was a catalog called, "Panic,"  which evolved into several issues. Through this event Koehnline became acquainted with Hakim Bey, for whom he has created several book covers. Through Bey he came to befriend members of the New York-based publishing collective, Autonomedia, having become involved with mail art projects initiated outside of the collective and becoming involved with zine culture.

Still living and working at Axe Street, and active in zine culture, Koehnline took a position as a librarian. With access to a large amount of visual material and A Reader's Guide to the Underground Press ready for output, Koehnline became a prolific cut and paste collagist.

References

External links
The Art of James Koehnline
Just Say No to the WTO graphics by Seattle artist, James Koehnline
An interview with James Koehnline

Living people
Artists from Seattle
Pacific Northwest artists
Minneapolis College of Art and Design alumni
Columbia College Chicago alumni
Year of birth missing (living people)